Abrar Fahad (born 12 February 1998), a second year student of electrical and electronic engineering (EEE)  department of the Bangladesh University of Engineering and Technology (BUET), was tortured and then killed by BUET's Chhatra League leaders inside BUET's Sher-e-Bangla Hall. Abrar's murderers have gotten a death sentence. An autopsy stated that Fahad was beaten to death by a blunt object.

Personal life
Abrar Fahad was born on 12 February 1998 in Kushtia, Bangladesh. His village home is in Kumarakhali, Kushtia. He finished early schooling from Kushtia Mission Primary School  and later studied in Kushtia Zilla School. He has also studied on Intermediate of Science (I.Sc.) in Notre Dame College, Dhaka-1000. Having been a high performing student at Notre Dame College in Dhaka, Fahad was one of the top 20 students from Dhaka Board in Higher Secondary School Certificate Examination. During college life, he has stayed  Arambagh, Motijheel 
, Dhaka -1000. He was also selected to study at the University of Dhaka (Genetics Engineering) and Dhaka Medical College after successfully passing the admission tests of the educational institutions respectively. In the University Of Dhaka, he occupied the 13th position in genetics engineering. According to some sources, an educational institution outside of Bangladesh selected him to study nuclear engineering- but he choose Bangladesh University of Engineering and Technology for his bachelor's degree. On 31 March 2018, he started studying in Bangladesh University of Engineering and Technology (BUET)..

Fahad's home in Kushtia was next door to the home of AL leader Mahbub Ul Alam Hanif. His father Barkatullah worked as an auditor at BRAC and mother Rokeya Khatun a kindergarten teacher. He was the elder of two brothers, his younger brother Abrar Faiyaj is a second-year HSC student at Dhaka College. Faiyaj would stay at the Dhaka College hostel, near the Sher-e-Bangla Hall.

Death
At the time of his death Fahad was a second-year (Term 1) student of the Department of Electrical and Electronic Engineering. He was killed in room number 2011 in Sher-e Bangla Hall. He was staying in room number 1011 in the same hall.

On 6 October 2019, Sunday night, around 8 pm, some 3rd year students summoned Fahad and other second year students to room 2011 of Sher-e-Bangla Hall, claimed Ashikul Islam Bitu, a second year student of Chemical Engineering department and the assistant secretary of BUET Chhatra League. Anick Sarker, a Chhatra League leader, information and research affairs secretary of BUET Chhatra League, also a 4th year student of Mechanical Engineering and Amit Shaha, deputy law affairs secretary of the same unit, led the attack on him and beat Abrar the most. Police had recovered Abrar's body at 3 in the early hours of Monday at the ground floor of Sher-e-Bangla Hall. Abrar was pronounced dead around 3 am by BUET Medical Officer Dr Md Mashuk Elahi. Footage captured by a closed-circuit camera installed on the residential hall's 2nd floor showed a few people dragging Abrar down the corridor by his hands and feet.

Facebook involvement 
He was killed for his views condemning the recent India-Bangladesh accord (September - October 2019).

Aftermath

Students of different universities across the country held demonstrations on their respective campuses and demanded exemplary punishment of the killers of BUET student. His death triggered protests on the BUET and Dhaka University campuses. Several hundred students of Dhaka University held a protest rally at the base of anti-terrorism Raju sculpture. Teachers and students of Jahangirnagar University also staged a human chain on the campus demanding capital punishment of the killers of Abrar. In Khulna, students of Khulna University barricaded the highways in front of their campus tying their faces with black badges formed a human chain in the main gate of the university and protested the murder of Abrar. 
 
Rajshahi University students protested at the gruesome killing of Abrar Fahad. The students also blocked Rajshahi-Dhaka highway for half an hour. Students of Shahjalal University of Science and Technology also held a human chain in front of main gate of the campus in Sylhet. The students later brought out a protest rally which paraded Sylhet-Sunamganj highway.

The BUET authorities banned all political activities on the campus and temporarily suspended 19 students, mostly leaders of the university's BCL unit, accused in Abrar Fahad killing case.

International response
UN, UK, Germany, France & US have strongly condemned the brutal murder of Abrar Fahad.

Trial 
Eighteen members of the BUET Chhatra League have been detained in connection with the murder.

On 8 December 2021, a Bangladesh court sentenced 20 university students to death and five more to life imprisonment for killing Fahad.

References

External links 

2019 in Bangladesh
2019 deaths
Deaths by person in Bangladesh
Murder in Bangladesh
Political scandals in Bangladesh
Political violence in Bangladesh
Human rights abuses in Bangladesh
2019 murders in Bangladesh
October 2019 events in Bangladesh
October 2019 crimes in Asia
Bangladesh University of Engineering and Technology alumni